Duncan Shipley Dalton  is a former Conservative Party activist and former unionist politician in Northern Ireland, who was an Ulster Unionist Party (UUP) Member of the Legislative Assembly (MLA) for South Antrim from 1998 to 2003.

From 1993–1994 he worked for the Royal Ulster Constabulary. Then, from 1994–98, he served in the Royal Irish Regiment.

Early life and education 
Shipley Dalton was born and brought up on the Isle of Wight. He studied law at the University of Essex. While serving in the Army he took his Bar examination at Queen's University Belfast and was called to the Bar of Northern Ireland in 1996, specialising in human rights and criminal defence. Later he completed a master's degree in human rights law at Queen's University Belfast. He also completed a further master's degree at Harvard University. In October 2019 he was called to the Bar of England and Wales.

Political career
In May 1996 Shipley Dalton was an unsuccessful candidate for the Conservative Party in the Northern Ireland Forum election in Strangford, gaining 380 votes or 0.9%. He subsequently joined the Ulster Unionist Party (UUP). After the completion of the Stormont talks in 1998 Shipley Dalton was a supporter of the Belfast Agreement. At the 1998 Northern Ireland Assembly election, he was elected in South Antrim. He initially aimed to be selected as candidate for the UUP in the South Antrim by-election in 2000, but later withdrew, claiming that the party leadership preferred David Campbell to be their candidate. He endorsed David Campbell, but announced his retirement from Assembly politics at the forthcoming 2003 election.

After standing down, Shipley Dalton moved to the United States, where he was a supporter of the Democratic Party. In 2007 he returned to Southampton and became a Labour Party member before being expelled.

References 

1970 births
Living people
Northern Ireland MLAs 1998–2003
Ulster Unionist Party MLAs
Labour Party (UK) people
Alumni of the University of Essex
Alumni of Queen's University Belfast
Harvard University alumni
Members of the Bar of Northern Ireland
Royal Irish Regiment (1992) officers
People from Newport, Isle of Wight